For the 1999 Rugby World Cup qualifiers, the Oceanian Federation was allocated three places in the final tournament and one place in the repechage.

Seven teams played in the Oceania qualifiers that were held over three stages from 1996 to 1998.

Round 1

|- bgcolor="C0FFC0"
|||2||2||0||0||62–19||6
|-
|||2||1||0||1||111–28||4
|-
|||2||0||0||2||6–132||2
|}

Round 2

|- bgcolor="C0FFC0"
|||2||2||0||0||73–17||6
|- bgcolor="C0FFC0"
|||2||1||0||1||78–32||4
|-
|||2||0||0||2||19–121||2
|}

Round 3

|- bgcolor="C0FFC0"
|||3||3||0||0||165–33||9
|- bgcolor="C0FFC0"
|||3||2||0||1||78–99||7
|- bgcolor="C0FFC0"
|||3||1||0||2||59–71||5
|- bgcolor="#ffffcc"
|||3||0||0||3||35–134||3
|}

Australia, Fiji, and Western Samoa qualified for RWC 1999, Tonga qualified for the repechage.

References

1999
Oceania
1996 in Oceanian rugby union
1997 in Oceanian rugby union
1998 in Oceanian rugby union